Love Diary may refer to:

Publications
Love Diary, periodical of Charlton Comics, from 1958 to 1976
Love Diary, periodical of Orbit Publications, from 1949 to 1955
Love Diary, periodical of Quality Comics, from 1937 to 1956

Music
Love Diary (Jinny Ng EP), 2010
Love Diary (C-REAL EP), 2012
Love Diaries, a 2010 album by Janice Vidal
"Love Diary", song in Japanese anime Combustible Campus Guardress